Bohnsdorf is a district in the borough Treptow-Köpenick of Berlin, Germany. It is located in the south-east of the city.

History
The locality was first mentioned in 1375 with the name of Benistorp.

Geography

Position
The locality is situated in the southeastern suburb of Berlin and borders with Altglienicke, Grünau, and with the municipality of Schönefeld, in the Brandenburg district of Dahme-Spreewald. Close to the village lies Berlin Brandenburg Airport. Previously when the airport was known as Berlin Schönefeld Airport before Brandenburg's construction the former runway 07L/25R ended near Bohnsdorf.

Trivia
Bohnsdorf gained some notoriety for its unsolvable traffic problems with the Bohnsdorfer Kreisel.

Parts
Bohnsdorf is not divided into zones. 
Parts of Bohnsdorf are (no subdivision) 
Falkenberg (north part)  
Falkenhorst (south-east part)

Personalities
 Max Buntzel
 Emil Rudolf Greulich
 Fritz Kühn

References

External links

Localities of Berlin

Populated places established in the 1370s